Agra Cantonment Assembly constituency (a.k.a. Agra Cantt.) is one of the 403 constituencies of the Uttar Pradesh Legislative Assembly, India. It is a part of the Agra district and one of the five assembly constituencies in the Agra Lok Sabha constituency. First assembly elections in  the Agra Cantonment assembly constituency were conducted in 1967 and the extant and serial number of this constituency was last defined in "Delimitation of Parliamentary and Assembly Constituencies Order, 2008". VVPAT facility with EVMs will arrive in the 2017 U.P assembly polls.

Wards / Areas

Agra Cantt. assembly constituency comprises "Agra CB" and Ward numbers 2, 3, 6, 7, 13, 14, 16, 20, 21, 24, 34, 40, 46, 47, 50, 52, 53, 54, 60, 65 & 68 in Agra municipal corporation.

Members of the Legislative Assembly

Election results

2022

2017

16th Vidhan Sabha: 2012 General Elections

See also

Agra district
Agra (Graduates constituency)
Agra Lok Sabha constituency
Government of Uttar Pradesh
List of Vidhan Sabha constituencies of Uttar Pradesh
Uttar Pradesh
Uttar Pradesh Legislative Assembly

References

External links
 

Assembly constituencies of Uttar Pradesh
Agra
Constituencies established in 1967
1967 establishments in Uttar Pradesh
Politics of Agra district